Nayini Narsimha Reddy (12 May 1934 – 22 October 2020) was an Indian politician. He served as the first Home Minister of Telangana from 2014 to 2018. He also took charge of portfolios including Prisons, Fire Services, Sainik Welfare, Labour and Employment. He was the Member of Legislative Council (MLC) of Telangana. He was the Senior Labour Leader in Telangana. A senior leader of the Telangana Rashtra Samithi (TRS), Reddy fought alongside K. Chandrashekar Rao for the statehood of Telangana.

Early life and education
Reddy was born and grew up in Neredugommu village of Devarakonda, Nalgonda district to a farmer couple, Devaiah Reddy and Subadhramma. He was educated up to HSC. He mainly took active role in 1969 Telangana Agitation and started his political career from Janata Party.

Career
He was first a labor union leader in VST industries. He took to active politics in Hyderabad as he had migrated to Hyderabad in the 1970s. He took active role in Telangana movement in 1969.
He won three times as MLA from Musheerabad Constituency in Hyderabad. He was a Cabinet Minister of Technical Education in Y. S. Rajasekhara Reddy's Cabinet from 2004 to 2008 in Government of Andhra Pradesh. He was the leader to form Telangana and took part in an active role with KCR and Senior Leader from TRS Party.

He joined Telangana Rashtra Samithi after K. Chandrashekhar Rao launched the party in 2001 and has been one of the key leaders in the movement. He won as MLA from TRS Party in 2014 Elections. He became the first Home Minister in the newly formed state of Telangana in K. Chandrashekhar Rao's cabinet. He was Member of Legislative Council (MLC) from Governor Quota. He was the Advisor for VST Labour Union Industries.

Death
In October 2020, Reddy was hospitalized with symptoms of COVID-19 during the COVID-19 pandemic in India. He tested positive for the disease on 28 September 2020; his wife (who was hospitalized), eldest son and son-in-law also tested positive. On 9 October, he tested negative, but his condition continued to deteriorate owing to lung infection and post-COVID complications, according to a statement from Apollo Hospitals. He died from extensive lung damage on 22 October 2020, at 12:25 AM at the age of 86.

References

1944 births
2020 deaths
Janata Party politicians
Members of the Telangana Legislative Council
People from Nalgonda
State cabinet ministers of Telangana
Telangana MLAs 2014–2018
Telangana Rashtra Samithi politicians
Deaths from lung disease
Deaths from the COVID-19 pandemic in India